Greg Page (October 25, 1958 – April 27, 2009) was an American professional boxer who competed from 1979 to 2001, and held the WBA heavyweight title from 1984 to 1985. He was also a regular sparring partner for Mike Tyson, famously knocking down the then-undefeated world champion during a 1990 session.

Amateur career
Page, after a brief stint with a Southern Indiana trainer, started amateur boxing at age 15 under the tutelage of Leroy Emerson at the Louisville Parks Department gym in the Cherokee Triangle neighborhood.

He first came to the public's attention by sparring several rounds with the iconic Muhammad Ali.

In 1976, at the USA–USSR Duals at the Caesars Palace, Las Vegas, Page scored a major victory when he defeated Igor Vysotsky, a top-ranked heavyweight amateur boxer in the world, who never has been knocked down, the big punching Russian who twice beat the legendary Cuban and three-time Olympic Gold Medalist Teofilo Stevenson. Page also beat James Tillis, Tony Tubbs, Mitch Green, and Marvin Stinson.

By that time he was the #1 ranked amateur heavyweight in the United States.

At the USA vs. socialist countries duals held in 1977-1978 Page defeated Polish Antoni Kuskowski on points (3–0), lost a 1–2 points decision to Cuban Angel Milián, stopped Romanian Mircea Șimon in the third round, defeated East German Juergen Fanghaenel on points.

Page won the National AAU Heavyweight Championship in 1977. The following year, he repeated as the National AAU Heavyweight Champion and won the National Golden Gloves Heavyweight Championship.

Amateur highlights
 1975 National Golden Gloves Quarterfinalist, losing a decision to John Tate.
  1976 Ohio State Fair Champion, upsetting National AAU Champion Marvin Stinson.
  1976 National Golden Gloves Semi-Finalist, losing a decision to Michael Dokes.
  1977 National AAU Heavyweight Champion, defeating Woody Clark. Page avenged an earlier loss to Clark, and was named the tournament's outstanding boxer.
  1977 National Golden Gloves Finalist, losing to Jimmy Clark.
  1978 National AAU Heavyweight champion.
  1978 National Golden Gloves Heavyweight Champion, stopping William Hosea at 2:38 of the second round
 Defeated Igor Vysotsky, the man who twice beat Cuban legend Teofilo Stevenson.
 Defeated Tony Tubbs six out of seven times while in amateurs.
 Finished amateur career having 105 fights under his belt, with a record of 94–11.

Professional career

Early years
Page turned pro in February 1979, knocking out Don Martin in two rounds before a crowd of 7,500 at the Commonwealth Convention Center in Louisville. He put together 13 straight wins, 12 by knockout. The only fighter to go the distance with Page was George Chaplin, whom he defeated by a ten-round majority decision. Afterwards, Page was ranked in the top ten by the WBA.

USBA heavyweight champion
Page won the vacant USBA Heavyweight title on February 7, 1981 with a seventh-round TKO of Stan Ward.

After knocking out Marty Monroe and Alfredo Evangelista, Page had a rematch with George Chaplin and won by a twelve-round split decision. He followed the Chaplin win with a fourth-round knockout of Scott LeDoux.

Page retained the USBA belt with a unanimous decision over Jimmy Young on May 2, 1982. The following month, on the undercard of the Larry Holmes/Gerry Cooney fight, Page fought Trevor Berbick. Fighting with a broken right thumb from the second round, Page lost for the first time as a professional, dropping a ten-round unanimous decision to Berbick.

Page returned to defend the USBA belt against contender James "Quick" Tillis in November 1982. After suffering the first knockdown of his career in the second round, Page came back to KO Tillis in the eighth round.

World title fights and becoming WBA heavyweight champion
According to a New York Times article, Butch Lewis had Page set up to fight the winner of Mike Weaver-Randy Cobb WBA world title fight in  mid-to-late 1982, but Page had switched his allegiance from Lewis to Don King. In addition, Page had contacted his lawyer in March of that year to drop his ranking in the WBA from #2 to #3, behind Michael Dokes.

In 1983, Page retained the USBA title again, beating Renaldo Snipes over twelve rounds and taking his WBC #1 ranking. WBC heavyweight champion Larry Holmes, claiming the $2.55 million purse he was offered to fight Page wasn't enough, vacated the WBC title.

In March 1984, Page fought Tim Witherspoon for the vacant WBC belt. Incensed over money troubles with promoter Don King, Page had gone on strike in the gym and arrived out of shape for the bout. Witherspoon, who had lost a disputed decision to Holmes the previous year, pulled off an upset and took the title with a twelve-round majority decision. After the fight, Page fired Leroy Emerson as his trainer.

Page returned in August with new trainer Janks Morton, and fought undefeated David Bey. Page lost his second fight in a row when Bey took a twelve-round unanimous decision.

When Bey refused to fight reigning WBA heavyweight title holder Gerrie Coetzee in Sun City, South Africa due to Apartheid, Page stepped in. Page knocked Coetzee down twice before knocking him out in the eighth round to win the title, in a round that was unusual as it overran by a minute.

Page made his first title defense against Tony Tubbs in Buffalo, New York on April 29, 1985. Page had beaten Tubbs six out of seven times in the amateurs and was the favorite to win, but Tubbs upset the odds and won by a fifteen-round unanimous decision. To make matters worse, Page's hotel room in Buffalo was burgled. Taken was Page's championship belt, a $13,000 watch, and a $10,000 mink coat belonging to his road cook.

Downward spiral
Page returned to face James "Buster" Douglas in January 1986. Douglas stunned Page and took a unanimous decision. Frequently out of shape, Page also lost to Orlin Norris in a title fight and even to the journeyman Mark Wills.

Page became a regular sparring partner for reigning World Heavyweight Champion Mike Tyson in the late 1980s and boxed on several of his undercards. Before Tyson's upset loss to Buster Douglas in February 1990, Page decked Tyson in a public sparring session. He was believed to be in line to fight Tyson when he lost to Wills.

Page continued to fight and, in 1992, fought the Jamaican Donovan "Razor" Ruddock. Ruddock was returning after two big fights with Tyson that, due to the subsequent incarceration of Tyson, had established Ruddock as arguably the world's best heavyweight. Page gave Ruddock a hard time before being rocked by a series of big shots in the eighth round, which caused the referee to stop the contest.

After defeating former WBA Heavyweight Champion James "Bonecrusher" Smith by a unanimous decision, Page was matched with former WBO Heavyweight Champion Francesco Damiani in September 1992. In a close contest, he lost two points for repeatedly losing his mouthpiece. The point deductions cost Page a draw: All three judges had Damiani winning by two points. In August 1993 Page boxed future WBA Heavyweight Champion Bruce Seldon and was stopped in the ninth round. He retired after the fight.

Comeback
After retiring, Page started training boxers. He worked with Oliver McCall and was in McCall's corner when he stunningly scored a second-round knockout of Lennox Lewis to win the WBC World Heavyweight Championship in London on September 24, 1994 and was also present for McCall's infamous breakdown in the rematch with Lewis.

He trained boxers for several years, but grew restless. "I was training boxers to fight guys I could beat myself," Page said.

Page returned to the ring in May 1996. He went 16-0-1 with 15 knockouts before taking on Monte Barrett in October 1998. Barrett, 18-0 with 12 knockouts, won by a lopsided unanimous decision.

After dropping a dubious decision to journeyman Artis Pendergrass, Page had a rematch with Tim Witherspoon in June 1999. The 40-year-old Page scored a first round knockdown and won when the 41-year-old Witherspoon tore a muscle in his back and couldn't come out for the eighth round.

Page went 2-2 in his next four fights. He was well past his prime, but he continued to fight because he needed money. In 1998, Page filed for bankruptcy, claiming a $50,000 debt. By 2000, he was working his first 9-to-5 job, painting dental equipment at Whip-Mix Corp. in the South End of Louisville.

Injury
On March 9, 2001, Page fought Dale Crowe at Peel's Palace in Erlanger, Kentucky for $1,500. Page appeared to be holding his own with Crowe until the tenth round. Crowe said, "The timekeeper smacked the mat with his hand toward the end of the fight to indicate ten seconds were left, and that's when I went after Greg with one last flurry." Crowe hit Page with a flush left to the chin and then pushed him back. Page fell against the ropes, slid down, and was counted out by the referee.

What followed was chaos. There was no ambulance, no team of paramedics, nor oxygen, all of which were required by law. The ringside doctor, Manuel Mediodia, wasn't licensed in Kentucky and was under suspension in Ohio. At the time of the stoppage, Mediodia had already left and had to be brought back into the building. Twenty-two minutes passed before an ambulance arrived.

Before the fight, Page's trainer, James Doolin, complained to several members of the state commission about the conditions, including the lack of oxygen. He then wrote his complaints on a piece of paper and sealed it inside an envelope. Doolin gave it to the commission chairman, Jack Kerns, who then gave it back to Doolin. "Mail it to me," Kerns said.

Page was taken to the emergency room at St. Luke's hospital, where a CT scan revealed a huge mass being formed by the bleeding inside his head. He was then transported to University Hospital in Cincinnati. During post-fight brain surgery, he suffered a stroke and was left paralyzed on the left side of his body. Page was in a coma for nearly a week.

For the rest of his life, Page suffered many complications from his injury. He was hospitalized numerous times for such ailments as pneumonia, acute respiratory failure, sepsis, hypothermia, and seizures.

Page filed a lawsuit against the state of Kentucky and settled out of court for $1.2 million in 2007. As part of the settlement, boxing safety regulations the state enacted the previous year were named the "Greg Page Safety Initiative."

Death
In the early morning hours of April 27, 2009, Page died at home in Louisville. His death was consistent with positional asphyxia, an inability to breathe because of body position. "He had a hospital bed at home, and he slid out, which he has done before," said Jim Wesley, a Jefferson County deputy coroner. "His head was lodged between the rail and the bed."

About 100 friends, family and admirers gathered at Our Lady of Mount Carmel for his funeral, which ran more than two hours. Amid tears, gospel music and emotional speeches, messages were read from State Senator Gerald Neal, who praised Page's "gallant fight," and Louisville Mayor Jerry Abramson, who said Page's legacy would live on.

Professional boxing record

References

External links

AP Obituary in the Louisville Courier-Journal

Deaths due to injuries sustained in boxing
National Golden Gloves champions
Sports deaths in Kentucky
Boxers from Louisville, Kentucky
World Boxing Association champions
Winners of the United States Championship for amateur boxers
World heavyweight boxing champions
1958 births
2009 deaths
American male boxers
Central High School (Louisville, Kentucky) alumni
African-American boxers
20th-century African-American sportspeople
21st-century African-American people